The 2013 Lebanese Elite Cup is the 16th edition of this football tournament in Lebanon. The competition started on 25 August through to the final on 14 September. This tournament includes the six best teams from the 2012–13 Lebanese Premier League season.

Group stage

Group A

Group B

Final stage

Semi finals

Final

Lebanese Elite Cup seasons
Elite